The 6th annual Nickelodeon Australian Kids' Choice Awards were held on 11 October 2008 at the Hisense Arena in Melbourne. John Cena was picked to host the Nickelodeon Kids Choice Awards alongside Natalie Bassingthwaighte.

Nominees & Winners
Winners in Bold

Random

So Hot Right Now
 Short Stack
 Australian Idol
 Dash and Will
 Jessica Mauboy
 Foo Fighters
 ABBA

Fave Movie
 Alvin and the Chipmunks
 Get Smart
 Kung Fu Panda
 Step Up 2: The Streets

Funniest Duo
 Dave Lawson and James Kerley
 Flight of the Conchords
 Hamish Blake and Andy Lee
 Maude Garrett and Kyle Linahan

Fave Music Show
 Dance on Sunset
 The Music Jungle
 Video Hits
 WhatUWant

Biggest Greenie
 Bindi Irwin - Wildlife Warrior
 Isabel Lucas - All-Round Green Goddess
 Merrick and Rosso - Carbon Neutral Comedians
 Nicole Kidman - UNICEF Ambassador

Fave Aussie
 Rove McManus
 Bindi Irwin
 Delta Goodrem
 Ricki-Lee Coulter

Music

Fave Singer
 Delta Goodrem
 Gabriella Cilmi
 Ricki-Lee Coulter
 Vanessa Amorosi

Fave Band
 Faker
 Jonas Brothers
 Operator Please
 The Veronicas

Fave Song
 Low - Flo Rida
 No Air - Jordin Sparks and Chris Brown
 Shake It - Metro Station
 Untouched - The Veronicas

Fave International Band
 Fall Out Boy
 Panic! at the Disco
 Paramore
 Simple Plan

Fave International Singer
 Chris Brown
 Miley Cyrus
 Pink
 Rihanna

TV

Fave Comedy Show
 Drake & Josh
 Hannah Montana
 iCarly
 Mortified

Fave Toon
Was not on the broadcast
 Avatar
 Family Guy
 SpongeBob SquarePants
 The Simpsons

Fave Drama Show
 Blue Water High
 H2O: Just Add Water
 Home and Away
 Neighbours

Fave Reality TV Show
 Australia's Next Top Model
 Australian Idol
 Football Superstar
 So You Think You Can Dance

Fave Action Show
 Camp Orange
 Friday Night Live
 Wipeout
 WWE

Stars

Fave Sports Stars
 Casey Stoner
 Grant Hackett
 John Cena
 Ryan Sheckler

Fave International TV Stars
Was not on the broadcast
 Ashley Tisdale - The Suite Life of Zack & Cody
 Drake Bell - Drake & Josh
 Miley Cyrus - Hannah Montana
 Miranda Cosgrove - iCarly

Fave Movie Star
Was not on the broadcast
 Anne Hathaway
 Emma Roberts
 Jack Black
 Zac Efron

Fave TV Star
 Andrew G - Australian Idol
 Dean Geyer - Neighbours
 Lincoln Lewis - Home and Away
 Rove McManus - Are You Smarter Than a 5th Grader?

Official Soundtrack

An official soundtrack for the awards show was released on 4 October 2008.

 Metro Station - Shake It
 The Veronicas - This Love
 Rihanna - Take a Bow
 The Presets - This Boy's in Love
 Chris Brown - With You
 Britney Spears - Break the Ice
 Pnau - Baby
 The Potbelleez - Don't Hold Back
 Newton Faulkner - Dream Catch Me
 Axle Whitehead - I Don't Do Surprises
 Operator Please - Two for My Seconds
 Delta Goodrem - You Will Only Break My Heart
 Brian McFadden - Twisted
 Sara Bareilles - Love Song
 Faker - This Heart Attack
 Ashlee Simpson - Outta My Head (Ay Ya Ya)
 Jordin Sparks/Chris Brown - No Air
 Colbie Caillat - Bubbly
 The Galvatrons - When We Were Kids
 September - Cry For You
 Rogue Traders - I Never Liked You

References

External links
 KCA 2008 website

Nickelodeon Kids' Choice Awards
2008 awards
2008 in Australian television
2000s in Melbourne